Mohamed Meziane (born 7 March 1967) is a Moroccan weightlifter. He competed in the men's lightweight event at the 1992 Summer Olympics.

References

1967 births
Living people
Moroccan male weightlifters
Olympic weightlifters of Morocco
Weightlifters at the 1992 Summer Olympics
Place of birth missing (living people)
20th-century Moroccan people
21st-century Moroccan people